Mariette DiChristina Is the dean of the College of Communication at Boston University, of which she is an alumna. She was the editor-in-chief of the magazine Scientific American from December 2009 to September 2019. A science journalist for more than 20 years, she first came to Scientific American in 2001 as its executive editor. She is also the past president (in 2009 and 2010) of the 2,500-member National Association of Science Writers. She has been an adjunct professor in the graduate Science, Health and Environmental Reporting program at New York University for the past few years. DiChristina is a frequent lecturer and has appeared at the 92nd Street Y in New York, Yale University and New York University among many others. In 2011, DiChristina was named a Fellow of the American Association for the Advancement of Science (AAAS) for the Section on General Interest in Science and Engineering.

Before joining Scientific American, DiChristina spent nearly 14 years at Popular Science in positions culminating as executive editor. Her work in writing and overseeing articles about space topics helped garner that magazine the Space Foundation's 2001 Douglas S. Morrow Public Outreach Award. In spring 2005, she was Science Writer in Residence at the University of Wisconsin–Madison. Her chapter on science editing appears in the second edition of A Field Guide for Science Writers. She is former chair of Science Writers in New York (2001 to 2004) and a member of the American Society of Magazine Editors and the Society of Environmental Journalists. DiChristina was honored by New York's Italian Heritage and Culture Committee in its October 2009 celebration of Galileo's contributions to science. In January 2010, she was honored by the National Organization of Italian American Women as one of its "Three Wise Women" of 2009.

In September 2010, Nature Publishing Group, Scientific American'''s parent organization, became a member of Change the Equation, a CEO-led initiative to cultivate widespread literacy in STEM in the U.S., as part of President Obama's "Educate to Innovate" campaign. Led by DiChristina, Scientific American'' has launched several programs in 2011 in support of the initiative's goals.

References 

Year of birth missing (living people)
Living people
American science writers
Scientific American people
Academic journal editors
Women science writers
20th-century American journalists
20th-century American women writers
21st-century American journalists
21st-century American academics
21st-century American women writers
Women deans (academic)
Boston University people
New York University faculty
Fellows of the American Association for the Advancement of Science